Van Themsche or Vanthemsche is a surname. Notable people with the surname include:

Frieda Van Themsche (born 1955), Belgian politician
Hans Van Themsche (born 1988), Belgian spree killer
Piet Vanthemsche (born 1955), Belgian civil servant

Surnames of Dutch origin